Euphorbia bwambensis is a species of plant in the family Euphorbiaceae. It is found in the Republic of the Congo and Uganda.

References

Vulnerable plants
bwambensis
Taxonomy articles created by Polbot